Mailapur or Mailapura may refer to:

 Mylapore, a borough of Madras, India
 Dioceses of Saint Thomas of Mylapore, Roman Catholic dioceses of Mylapore, Madras, India 
 Mailapura, Yadgir, a village in Yadagir taluka, Yadgir district, Karnataka, India